Bill G. Ingebrigtsen (born March 26, 1952) is a Minnesota politician and member of the Minnesota Senate. A member of the Republican Party of Minnesota, he represents District 8, which includes parts of Douglas and Otter Tail counties in the west central part of the state.

Early life, education, and career
Ingebrigtsen was born in Karlstad, Minnesota, in 1952. He graduated from Hallock High School, obtained an A.A. in law enforcement from Alexandria Technical College, and attended the National Sheriffs Institute of Business Management. He was a Douglas County deputy sheriff from 1972 to 1991. He ran for and was elected sheriff in 1990. He was reelected in 1994, 1998, and 2002, serving in that position from 1991 to 2007.

Minnesota Senate
Ingebrigtsen was first elected in 2006 and reelected in 2010, 2012, 2016, and 2020. In 2008, he was appointed to the Minnesota Lessard Outdoor Heritage Council by then-Senate Majority Leader Larry Pogemiller.

Electoral history
Minnesota Senate 8th district election, 2012
Bill Ingebrigtsen (R), 22,693 votes (52.86%)
Dan Skogen (DFL), 20,197 votes (47.04%)
Write-in, 42 votes (0.10%)
Minnesota Senate 11th district election, 2010
Bill Ingebrigtsen (R), 20,798 votes (64.98%)
Jim Thoreen (DFL), 11,171 votes (34.90%)
Write-in, 37 votes (0.12%)
Minnesota Senate 11th district election, 2006
Bill Ingebrigtsen (R), 17,699 votes (51.30%)
Dallas Sams (DFL), 16,765 votes (48.59%)
Write-in, 38 votes (0.11%)

References

External links

Senator Bill Ingebrigtsen official Minnesota Senate website
Minnesota Public Radio Votetracker: Senator Bill Ingebrigtsen

1952 births
Living people
Alexandria Technical and Community College alumni
People from Kittson County, Minnesota
Republican Party Minnesota state senators
People from Douglas County, Minnesota
21st-century American politicians